Mount Dennis is an intermodal transit terminal under construction in Toronto, Ontario, Canada. Located east of the intersection of Eglinton Avenue and Weston Road in the Mount Dennis neighbourhood in the district of York, the station will be the western terminus of the future Line 5 Eglinton as well as an intermediate station on the GO Transit Kitchener line and Union Pearson Express. The station has been designated as one of many "mobility hubs" in Greater Toronto. It is scheduled to open in 2023.

The station is being built on the lands formerly known as Kodak Heights, which was a camera manufacturing facility operated by the Eastman Kodak Company from 1918 to 2006. The station will use Kodak Building 9, a heritage building and local landmark, as a station entrance. Adjacent to the station, the Eglinton Maintenance and Storage Facility is also located on the lands.

Timeline
A draft prepared on April 10, 2013, established four designs for the station. Two designs placed the bus platform on the north side of Eglinton, accessed through a  pedestrian tunnel. In the other two designs, the bus platforms were on the south side of Eglinton, accessed through a  pedestrian tunnel.

By 2016, the finalized design placed the bus loop on the north side of the station, accessed by a relocated Photography Drive bridge that crosses Eglinton further to the east than the old bridge. This roadway would pass east of the renovated Kodak building, which would form the station's third entrance.

On the weekend of February 19 to 21, 2016, the Photography Drive bridge over Eglinton Avenue was demolished to make way for construction on the Mount Dennis station site.

In August 2016, the former Kodak building was temporarily moved  to facilitate construction. On November 13, 2017, the building was moved back to sit on a newly built foundation. The community wanted this landmark preserved; thus, it will become an integral part of Mount Dennis station.

By August 2018, some track had already been laid within the Line 5 portion of the station. By August 2019, track had been extended from the station platform eastwards past the junction with the Eglinton Maintenance and Storage Facility, but overhead wire for pantographs had not yet been hung; escalators and wall tiles were being installed; graffiti had been removed from the Kodak building and restoration work to its interior was in progress.

By the fourth quarter of 2020, light rail vehicles were making test runs between Mount Dennis and Keelesdale stations.

Description
In addition to being a landmark and a Heritage Interest Building, the former Kodak building will be a focal point for riders using the mobility hub, as many of the mobility hub's features are linked to this building. It will have a waiting area and public washrooms, and retail spaces on the main and basement levels. The upper floors of the building will be used for rented offices, to provide a space for community use, and will include an auditorium.

The station will have three entrances:
 The main entrance and a station plaza will be located between Weston Road and the GO Transit Kitchener rail corridor. There will be an underground passage from the main entrance to the former Kodak building.
 The secondary entrance will be located at street level on the north side of Eglinton Avenue West on the east side of the rail bridges for the Kitchener rail corridor.
 The third entrance and another station plaza will be at the former Kodak building.

The hub will encompass the following services:
 Line 5 Eglinton will terminate at Mount Dennis, and there will be special track work for reversing LRT trains. The LRT platform will have a glass wall allowing natural light into the space.
 GO Transit and UP Express station will have platforms constructed along the Kitchener rail corridor and be accessible from the underground connection between the main entrance and the waiting room in the former Kodak building.
 The off-street TTC bus terminal will have 15 bays and will be connected to the former Kodak building. The bus terminal will have its own space for retail.
 The passenger pick-up and drop-off area will be available to riders of any of the hub's transit services. There will also be four taxi stands nearby.
 Bicycle storage will include 40 outdoor and 80 indoor spaces. Indoor storage will be provided at the main entrance.

East of the station, the LRT line would travel on an elevated guideway above Black Creek Drive and Black Creek itself, before descending into the western portal of the line's bored tunnel, towards Keelesdale Station.

As part of a program to install artworks at major interchange stations along Line 5 Eglinton, Mount Dennis Station will feature two artworks:
 Up to This Moment, by Hadley + Maxwell, will be a video display of an image documenting changes to the Kodak Heights site. The image displayed will change daily. The artwork will be located on the east wall of the upper concourse; it will be visible from Eglinton Avenue through the south-side, glass wall of the station.
 An untitled work by Sara Cwynar will feature a brightly coloured, wall-sized mural consisting of a collage of photographic images, digitally printed on layered glass panels. The artwork will be located along a pedestrian corridor within the station.

Surface connections 

, the following are the proposed connecting routes that would serve this station when Line 5 Eglinton opens:

References

External links

The following videos were released by the Crosstown project:
  published on November 17, 2017
  Published on June 19, 2018.
  published on January 25, 2018
  published on January 26, 2018
  published on August 10, 2018 giving a virtual tour of the station

Line 5 Eglinton stations
Future GO Transit railway stations